The Merriman Street Terraces are heritage-listed terrace houses located at 20-48 Merriman Street, in the inner city Sydney suburb of Millers Point in the City of Sydney local government area of New South Wales, Australia. It is also known as (part of) Davies Terrace. The property was added to the New South Wales State Heritage Register on 2 April 1999.

History 
Millers Point is one of the earliest areas of European settlement in Australia, and a focus for maritime activities. Merriman Street contains a substantial collection of Georgian style houses and terraces.

Description 
The Merriman Street terraces are all Georgian style Victorian terraces.

The external condition of the property is good.

Heritage listing 
Merriman Street contains housing groups of the utmost historical importance.

It is part of the Millers Point Conservation Area, an intact residential and maritime precinct. It contains residential buildings and civic spaces dating from the 1830s and is an important example of C19th adaptation of the landscape.

Merriman Street Terraces was listed on the New South Wales State Heritage Register on 2 April 1999.

See also 

Australian residential architectural styles

References

Bibliography

Attribution

External links

 

New South Wales State Heritage Register sites located in Millers Point
Victorian architecture in Sydney
Terraced houses in Sydney
Articles incorporating text from the New South Wales State Heritage Register
Millers Point Conservation Area